The Osing language (Osing: Basa Using), locally known as the language of Banyuwangi, is the language of the Osing people of East Java, Indonesia.

Some Osing words have the infix /-y-/  'ngumbyah', 'kidyang', which are pronounced /ngumbah/ and /kidang/ in standard Javanese, respectively.

Divergent Osing vocabulary includes:
osing/sing 'not' (standard Javanese: ora) 
paran 'what' (standard Javanese: åpå)
kadhung 'if" (standard Javanese:yèn,lèk,nèk)
kelendhi 'how' (standard Javanese:kepiyè,piyè)
maning 'again' (standard Javanese:manèh,the Banyumasan dialect of Javanese also uses 'maning')
isun 'I/me' (standard Javanese:aku)
rikå 'you' (standard Javanese:kowè,the Banyumasan dialect also uses "rikå")
ring/nong 'in/at/on' (standard Javanese:ning,nang,the Balinese language and Old Javanese also uses "ring")
masiyå/ambèknå 'even if'/'although' (standard Javanese:senadyan,senajan,najan, the Arekan dialect of Javanese also uses 'masiyå')

References

External links
   - CNN Indonesia documentary
   - Balai Pelestarian Nilai Budaya D.I. Yogyakarta documentary

Javanese language
Languages of Indonesia